Chauffailles is a commune in the Saône-et-Loire department in the region of Bourgogne-Franche-Comté in eastern France.

Geography

Culture
Chauffailles was the base of the Congrégation des Soeurs de l'Enfant-Jésus de Chauffailles, an order of teaching nuns founded by Reine Antier (1801–83).

See also
Communes of the Saône-et-Loire department

References

Communes of Saône-et-Loire